Oxygoniola chamaeleon is a species of beetles in the family Cicindelidae, the only species in the genus Oxygoniola.

References

Cicindelidae
Monotypic Adephaga genera